Protik "Tiku" Majumder (born 1960) is a physicist who is the Barclay Jermain Professor of Natural Philosophy at Williams College. He was the interim president of Williams from December 2017 to July 2018, replacing Adam Falk, who left to become president of the Alfred P. Sloan Foundation. He was replaced by Maud Mandel.

Majumder was born in Kolkata and was raised in western Massachusetts. He graduated with a bachelor's degree from Yale University in 1982 and obtained his Ph.D. in atomic physics from Harvard University in 1989. He joined the faculty of Williams College in 1994.

References 

Williams College faculty
Presidents of Williams College
Yale University alumni
Harvard University alumni
Scientists from Kolkata
21st-century American physicists
Living people
1960 births
Scientists from Massachusetts
Indian emigrants to the United States
20th-century American physicists
American academics of Indian descent
Fellows of the American Physical Society